Double diamond may refer to:

 Double Diamond (album), 1973 release by British jazz-rock group If
 Double Diamond Baseball, a sport based on traditional baseball
  Double Diamond, a Double Black Diamond ski trail rating
 Double Diamond Burton Ale, a brand of beer brewed by Carlsberg UK
 Double Diamond International, a team golf tournament played in the 1970s
 Double Diamond Individual Championship, an individual golf tournament played in the 1970s
 Double diamond, a music recording sales certification
 Double Diamond, a pin-setter used in five-pin bowling
 Double Diamond (design process model) as described by the British Design Council
 A (mineral) diamond within another diamond
 The "Double Diamond", the name given to the logo of the English sportswear brand Umbro